Evkafçiftliği is a village in Silifke district of Mersin Province, Turkey. The village is to the east of Turkish state highway . The population of the village is 156 as of 2011. During the Ottoman Empire era, the village was a vakıf which was dedicated for sustaining holy places in Mecca and Medina (now in Saudi Arabia). Although it is no longer a vakıf, it still keeps its former name ( Evkafçitliği means " vakıf farm"). The main economic activity is farming. The village produces olives and various fruits. There is also an olive press which serves olive producers in Göksu River valley.

References

Villages in Silifke District